The 1944 United States presidential election in Massachusetts took place on November 7, 1944, as part of the 1944 United States presidential election, which was held throughout all contemporary 48 states. Voters chose 16  representatives, or electors to the Electoral College, who voted for president and vice president.

Massachusetts voted for the Democratic nominee, incumbent President Franklin D. Roosevelt of New York, over the Republican nominee, Governor Thomas E. Dewey of New York. Roosevelt ran with Senator Harry S. Truman of Missouri, while Dewey’s running mate was Governor John W. Bricker of Ohio.

Roosevelt carried the state with 52.80% of the vote to Dewey’s 46.99%, a Democratic victory margin of 5.81%.

As Roosevelt was re-elected nationally to his fourth and final term, Massachusetts weighed in as about 2% more Republican than the national average.

Once a typical Yankee Republican bastion in the wake of the Civil War, Massachusetts had been a Democratic-leaning state since 1928, when a coalition of Irish Catholic and other ethnic immigrant voters primarily based in urban areas turned Massachusetts and neighboring Rhode Island into New England’s only reliably Democratic states. Massachusetts voted for Al Smith in 1928, and for Franklin Roosevelt in his three election campaigns preceding 1944. Roosevelt’s 1944 victory thus marked the fifth straight win for the Democratic Party in Massachusetts, although Roosevelt’s victory margin was slightly reduced from 1940.

Roosevelt and Dewey would split the state’s 14 counties, winning 7 counties each. However Roosevelt won the most heavily populated parts of the state including the cities of Boston, Worcester, and Springfield, while most of Dewey’s wins were small or island counties.

Results

Results by county

See also
 United States presidential elections in Massachusetts

References

Massachusetts
1944
1944 Massachusetts elections